IEO may refer to:

 Independent Evaluation Office, of the World Bank
 International English Olympiad, a competition conducted by the Science Olympiad Foundation
 Istituto Europeo di Oncologia, the European Institute of Oncology
 Interior-Earth object or Atira asteroid
 Institut d'Estudis Occitans (Institute of Western Studies), a cultural organization
 Initial exchange offering